Charmed is a 1998–2006 television series from The WB.

Charmed may also refer to:

Film, television, and video games
 Charmed (2018 TV series), a television series reboot from The CW
 Charmed (video game), based on the fourth season of the 1998 TV series
 Charmed, I'm Sure, a 1909 silent film directed by Charles K. French

Music
 Charmed: The Soundtrack (2003), the first soundtrack album of the 1998 TV series
 Charmed: The Book of Shadows (2005), the second soundtrack album of the 1998 TV series
 Charmed (group), a Norwegian girl band

Other media
 Charmed (comics), a licensed comic book continuation of the 1998 television series
 Charmed board games, several official board game adaptations of the 1998 television series
 Charmed merchandise, a list of merchandise for the 1998 television series

Science
 Charm quark or "charmed", a subatomic particle
 Charmonium or "Charmed", a quark-antiquark particle

See also
 Charm (disambiguation)